Moonlighter or The Moonlighter(s) can refer to:

 Moonlighter, a person who works another job, often at night, for extra income
 Moonlighter (video game), a 2018 indie video game
 Moonlighter (fish), a species of fish
 The Moonlighter, a 1953 Western film
 Bobby Lester & The Moonlighters, an incarnation of The Moonglows
 Bliss Blood side project called The Moonlighters, a 1920s-style jazz string band
 Dendrocnide moroides, the most toxic of the Australian species of stinging trees, which has several nicknames including the moonlighter
 Moonlighters, a public information film about the dangers of playing with lighters

See also 

Moonlight (disambiguation)
Moonlighting (disambiguation)